The caisson, also referred to as a caisson ceiling, or spider web ceiling, in East Asian architecture is an architectural feature typically found in the ceiling of temples and palaces, usually at the centre and directly above the main throne, seat, or religious figure.
The caisson is generally a sunken panel set into the ceiling. It is often layered and richly decorated. Common shapes include squares, octagons, hexagons, circles, and a combination of these.

Name

The caisson is a general name for a coffer. In the case of East Asian architecture, however, the caisson is characterised by highly developed conventions as to its structure and placement.

Structure
The caisson is a sunken panel placed in the centre of the ceiling. It is raised above the level of the ceiling through use of the dougong (斗栱) structure, which, through interlocking structural members, as beams were not used, creates successive levels of diminishing size. Beams may also be used to create a hexagonal or octagonal caisson surrounded by a square border. These beams, and the dougong members, are usually visible, and richly carved and often painted with deities.

The centre of the caisson is decorated with a large bas-relief carving or painting. Common themes include "two dragons chasing the pearl". Caissons in the throne rooms of the Forbidden City feature a large, writhing dragon, from whose mouth issue a chandelier-like structure called the Yellow Emperor Mirror, a series of metal balls which are said to be able to show reflections of evil spirits.

Caissons were originally used to support skylights. Therefore, they are a relatively recent structure in the Chinese architectural history.

Use in other structures

The caisson has been found in tombs of the Han Dynasty dating the use of this architectural feature back at least 2,000 years. Besides subterranean structure, the oldest existent caisson in an above-ground structure is the one located above the  statue of Guanyin in the Guanyin Pavilion of Dule Monastery, Jixian, Hebei province, built in 984 during the Liao Dynasty. Without the use of interior columns, this ceiling is held up by a hidden second-floor four-sided frame with a hexagonal ceiling frame on the third floor.

In traditional Chinese architecture, every facet of a building was decorated using various materials and techniques. Simple ceiling ornamentations in ordinary buildings were made of wooden strips and covered with paper. More decorative was the lattice ceiling, constructed of woven wooden strips or sorghum stems fastened to the beams. The most decorative and the most complex ceiling was the caisson. 

Sanqing Hall (Hall of the Three Purities) is a Yuan period structure with "three" zaojing in its ceiling. A zaojing is a wooden dome over an imperial throne or statue in Chinese architecture.

As the caisson became increasingly standard in formal architecture in ancient China, similar structures also appeared in Buddhist grottos, such as in Dunhuang.

Cultural significance
Caissons were highly decorative and only included in important or highly decorated buildings. They had no specific cultural significance, since in structure they were equal to cupolas and domes constructed around the world. However the rich ornamentation often conveyed cultural significance in the themes chosen and in display within the caissons.

See also
 Chinese architecture
 Forbidden City

Notes

External links

Baoguo Temple - Dougong and caisson structures
A collection of caisson images at Fotoe.com

Architecture in China
Chinese architectural history
Ceilings
Traditional Chinese architecture